Dietzella zimmermanni is a species of minute seed weevil in the beetle family Curculionidae. It is found in North America. Larvae feed on leaves of Oenothera pilosella, Epilobium, and Circaea lutetania.

References

Curculionidae
Articles created by Qbugbot
Beetles described in 1837